Agnieszka Dubrawska (born 12 December 1958) is a Polish fencer. She competed at the 1980 and 1988 Summer Olympics.

References

External links
 

1958 births
Living people
Polish female fencers
Olympic fencers of Poland
Fencers at the 1980 Summer Olympics
Fencers at the 1988 Summer Olympics
Sportspeople from Gdańsk
20th-century Polish women
21st-century Polish women